Ciudad Real may refer to:
 Ciudad Real, city in Castilla-La Mancha, Spain
 Ciudad Real (province), province of central Spain
 San Cristóbal de las Casas, Mexican city, formerly called Ciudad Real
 Ciudad Real subdivision, barangay in Metropolitan Manila, the Philippines